The Romanian Gymnastics Federation (RGF) is the governing body of gymnastics in Romania. Established in 1906, it supervises gymnastics clubs and gymnasts' participation in international competitions. In 2013, Adrian Stoica was re-elected president of the RGF.

See also

Romania women's national gymnastics team

References

External links

1906 establishments in Romania
Gymnastics in Romania
National members of the European Gymnastics
Sports organizations established in 1906
Gymnastics